
 

West Range  is a locality in the Australian state of South Australia located on the state’s south-east coast overlooking Lacepede Bay which is part of the body of water known in Australia as the Southern Ocean and by international authorities as the Great Australian Bight.

Boundaries were created in December 1998 for the “long established name” which was ‘identified’ by the District Council of Lacepede.

West Range consists of land along the continental coastline extending from the northern end of Paranki Lagoon in the north to the Blackford Drain in the south and from the coast to the West Range Road in the east.  The Princes Highway passes through the locality from north to south between the coastline and the west side of an area of land subject to inundation and including the following water bodies (from north to south) - Paranki Lagoon, Partiari and Teilaka.

The majority land use within the locality is agriculture with a strip of land between the coastline and the Princes Highway and the full extent of the protected area associated with the Paranki Lagoon, i.e. the Paranki Lagoon Conservation Park, being zoned for conservation.

West Range is located within the federal division of Barker, the state electoral district of MacKillop and the local government area of the Kingston District Council.

References

Towns in South Australia
Limestone Coast